Hexa(tert-butoxy)dimolybdenum(III) is a coordination complex of molybdenum(III).  It is one of the homoleptic alkoxides of molybdenum.  An orange, air-sensitive solid, the complex has attracted academic attention as the precursor to many organomolybdenum derivatives.  It an example of a charge-neutral complex featuring a molybdenum to molybdenum triple bond (Mo≡Mo), arising from the coupling of a pair of d3 metal centers. It can be prepared by a salt metathesis reaction from the THF complex of molybdenum trichloride and lithium tert-butoxide:
2 MoCl3(thf)3  +  6 LiOBu-t  →  Mo2(OBu-t)6  +  6 LiCl  +  6 thf
The complex and its ditungsten (W2) analogue adopt an ethane-like geometry. The metal to metal bond distance is 222 pm in the related complex Mo2(OCH2CMe3)6.

See also
Hexa(tert-butoxy)ditungsten(III)

References

Alkoxides
Molybdenum(III) compounds